The United List of Russians (VKS) was a political party in Latvia in the early 1920s.

History
The party contested the 1920 Constitutional Assembly elections as Russian Citizens Groups (Krievu pilsoņu grupas), winning four seats. Prior to the 1922 elections it became the United List of Russians. The party won two seats in the Saeima, but did not contest any further elections.

References

Defunct political parties in Latvia
Russian political parties in Latvia